Socompa is a large stratovolcano at the border of Argentina and Chile with an elevation of  metres. Part of the Chilean and Argentine Andean Volcanic Belt (AVB), it is part of the Central Volcanic Zone, one of the various segments of the AVB. This part of the Andean volcanic arc begins in Peru and runs first through Bolivia and Chile, and then through Argentina and Chile, and contains about 44 active volcanoes. Socompa lies close to the pass of the same name, where the Salta-Antofagasta railway crosses the border.

Socompa is known for its large debris avalanche, which was formed 7,200 years ago when most of the northwestern slope collapsed and slid down, forming an extensive deposit. It was at first considered to be either a moraine or a nuee ardende deposit, until the 1980 eruption of Mount St. Helens prompted awareness of the instability of volcanic edifices and the existence of large scale collapses on them. Notable are the large toreva blocks which were left behind within the collapse crater. After the landslide, the volcano was rebuilt by the effusion of lava flows and much of the scar is now filled in.

Socompa is also noteworthy for the high-altitude biotic communities that are bound to fumaroles on the mountain and form well above the regular vegetation in the region. The climate on the mountain is cold and dry.

Geography and geomorphology 

Socompa is situated on the border between Argentina and Chile, due east of Monturaqui. The Salta–Antofagasta railway crosses the border between the two countries just below Socompa, rendering the volcano easily accessible despite its remote location. The same pass was an important route between the two countries and reportedly between 1940 and 1970 the Carabineros de Chile had a post there. The mountain is considered to be an apu by the local population, and Inca constructions have been reported either from its slopes or from its summit.

The volcano is part of the Central Volcanic Zone, one of the four volcanic zones of the Andean Volcanic Belt. The Central Volcanic Zone spans Peru, Bolivia, Chile and Argentina and contains about 44 active volcanoes, plus a number of monogenetic volcanoes and silicic caldera volcanoes. A number of older inactive volcanoes are well preserved owing to the dry climate of the region. Many of these systems are in remote regions and thus are poorly studied but pose little threat to humans.  The largest historical eruption in the Central Volcanic Zone occurred in 1600 at Huaynaputina in Peru, and the recently most active volcano is Lascar in Chile.

Several dacitic lava flows form the summit area of the volcano, the youngest of which originates in a summit dome. The summit area is surrounded by an inwards-dropping scarp that opens to the northwest and whose southern margin is buried by lava flows. Pyroclastic flows crop out beneath lava flows in the northwestern segment of the volcano, within the scarp. A large wedge-shaped scar is recognizable on the northwestern flank, delimited by prominent scarps running through the western and northern flanks of the edifice. The existence of a lake in the summit area within the scarps at elevations of  has been reported.

On the northeastern flank a pumice deposit is clearly visible. Lava domes have various shapes and are recognizable in the southern and western slopes, while lava flows appear mainly on the eastern and northern slopes. The volcano apparently developed within a northwest-striking valley, the southern part of which now contains Laguna Socompa.

Sector collapse

Socompa suffered a major sector collapse during the Holocene, forming one of the largest terrestrial collapse deposits. The deposit left by the collapse was first discovered on aerial photography in 1978 but the correct interpretation as a landslide occurred in 1985; at first it was interpreted as a form of moraine, then as a large pyroclastic flow and the collapse scar as a caldera.

The collapse occurred in several steps, with the first parts to fail ending up at the largest distances from the volcano; it is not established whether the collapse happened in a single event or as several separate failures.

The collapse left a triangle-shaped collapse scar, which was partly filled by blocks left over by the collapse. The central section of the collapse amphitheatre was not a simple collapse structure, but instead contained a secondary scarp. After the principal collapse, lava flows and pyroclastic flows – some of which emerge from the western rim of the collapse scar – filled up the scar left by the collapse. A structure named Domo del Núcleo in the scar may either be a remnant of the pre-collapse volcano, or collapse debris.

A similar collapse was observed in the 1980 eruption of Mount St. Helens. In fact, the occurrence of a large landslide at Mount St. Helens probably aided in the subsequent identification of the Socompa deposit as a landslide remnant. Other volcanoes have suffered from large scale collapses as well; this includes Aucanquilcha, Lastarria and Llullaillaco. In the case of Socompa, the occurrence of the collapse was probably influenced by a northwest tilt of the basement the volcano was constructed on; it caused the volcano to slide downward in its northwestern sector and made it prone to a collapse in that direction.

The collapse happened about  years ago, it was not witnessed in historical records. This event probably lasted only 12 minutes based on simulations. The growth rate of the volcano increased after the collapse, probably due to the mass removal unloading the magmatic system.

There is evidence in the collapse deposit that a lava flow was being erupted on the volcano when the landslide occurred, which together with the presence of pyroclastic fallout on the southwestern side of Socompa implies the collapse may have been started by volcanic activity. The quantity of water in the edifice rocks on the other hand was probably minor. Another theory assumes that the volcanic edifice was destabilized by ductile and mechanically weak layers beneath Socompa; under the weight of the volcano these layers can deform and "flow" outward from the edifice, causing the formation of thrusts at its foot. Evidence of such spreading of the basement under Socompa has been found.

Some evidence in the form of tephra suggests that the collapse was accompanied by a lateral blast, but other research found no such evidence. Such sector collapse events are catastrophic phenomena, and the debris avalanches associated with them can reach large distances from the original volcano. The fragmentation of rocks during the landslide and the fine material generated during this process might enhance the fluidity of the avalanche, allowing it to extend far away from the source.

Landslide deposit 

It forms the Negros de Aras surface northwest of the volcano and the El Cenizal surface due north where it has a hook-like surface distribution; the name "Negros de Aras" was given to the deposit before it was known that it had been formed by a landslide.

As later parts of the collapse overrode the earlier segments, they formed a northeast-trending scarp in the deposit, across which there is a striking difference in the surface morphology of the collapse. The landslide deposit has been stratigraphically subdivided into two units, the Monturaqui unit and the El Cenizal unit. The first unit forms most of the surface and consists itself of several subunits, one of which includes basement rocks that were integrated into the collapse as it occurred. Likewise, the El Cenizal unit included basement rocks as well, such as playa deposits. The amount of basement material is noticeably large and might form as much as 80% of the landslide volume; the topography of the northwestern side of the volcano may have prevented the mass failure from being localized along the basement-edifice surface area, explaining the large volume of basement involved. Further, the basement-derived material was probably mechanically weak and thus allowed the landslide to move over shallow slopes. This basement material forms part of the white surfaces in the landslide deposit; other bright areas are formed by fumarolically altered material. The basement material was originally considered to be pumice.

These blocks form an almost closed semicircle at the mouth of the collapse amphitheatre and in part retain the previous stratigraphy of the volcano. Such toreva blocks are far more frequent in submarine landslides than subaerial ones and their occurrence at Socompa may reflect the relatively non-explosive nature of the collapse and material properties of the collapsed mass. Aside from the toreva blocks, individual blocks with sizes of up to  occur in the deposit and form large boulder fields. In addition to the blocks, the surface of the landslide deposit contains hummock-like hills and small topographic depressions. Part of the landslide deposit was later covered by pyroclastic flows, and this covered area is known as the Campo Amarillo. As it descended, the landslide deposit filled a shallow valley that previously existed northwest of the volcano, as well as a larger northeast-striking depression. A lava flow was rafted on the avalanche to the El Cenizal area and ended up there almost unmodified.

The collapse deposit is well preserved by the arid climate, among the best preserved such deposits in the world. However, because of its sheer size its structure and stratigraphy were only appreciated with the help of remote sensing. Pleistocene lava flows and a northwest-striking drainage were buried by the landslide but can still be discerned from aerial imagery; apart from these and some hills most of the area covered by the landslide was relatively flat. At La Flexura, part of the basement beneath the avalanche crops out from the ground.

Geology

Regional 

It does not cause volcanism among the entire length of the trench; where the slab is subducting beneath the South America Plate at a shallow angle there is no recent volcanic activity.

The style of subduction has changed over time. About 27 million years ago, the Farallon Plate which hitherto had been subducting beneath South America broke up and the pace of subduction increased, causing increased volcanism. Around the same time, after the Eocene, the subduction angle increased beneath the Altiplano and caused the development of this plateau either from magmatic underplating and/or from crustal shortening; eventually the crust there became much thicker.

Local 

The presence of two calderas southeast and east of Socompa has been inferred. Monogenetic volcanoes were active in the area as well during the Pliocene and Quaternary and generated lava flows. One of these centres is El Negrillar just north of the collapse deposit, which was active during the Pleistocene and formed andesite-basaltic andesite lavas unlike the eruption products of Socompa itself.

Other volcanoes such as Cordon de Puntas Negras and the rim of the large La Pacana caldera farther north are also influenced by this lineament. A north-south trending lineament called the Llullaillaco Lineament is also linked to Socompa and to the Mellado volcano farther south.

To the west Socompa is bordered by the Sierra de Alameida (or Almeida), which farther north merges into the Cordon de Lila.

Basement 

The basement at Socompa is formed by Paleozoic and Mesozoic formations and by Quaternary sedimentary and volcanic rocks. Part of these beds were taken up into the avalanche as it collapsed and form the Flexura inliner, others appear in the Loma del Inca area north and the Monturaqui area due west of Socompa. The basement rocks are subdivided into three named formations, the Purilactus Formation of Paleozoic-Mesozoic age, the San Pedro and Tambores formations of Oligocene-Miocene age and the Miocene-Pliocene Salin formation; part of the latter formation may have been erupted by Socompa itself. The volcano is situated at the point where the Sierra de Alameida meets the Puna block.

During the Pliocene this basement was covered by the Arenosa and Tucucaro ignimbrites (2.5 and 3.2 million years ago by potassium-argon dating, respectively) which also crop out west of Socompa; Socompa is probably constructed on top of these ignimbrites.

Some normal faults appear in the area north of Socompa and appear to run through the edifice. While they are not visible in the edifice itself, Socompa was uplifted on its southeastern side by the fault motion. This might have aided in the onset of edifice instability and the collapse event. In addition, directly north-northwest of Socompa lie three anticlines probably formed under the influence of the mass of both Socompa and Pajonales: The Loma del Inca, Loma Alta and La Flexura.

Composition 

Socompa has erupted andesite and dacite, with dacite dominating. Phenocrysts found in the rocks of the avalanche include the minerals augite, hornblende, hypersthene, magnetite and plagioclase; dacites also contain biotite while andesites also contain olivine. In the summit area, hydrothermal alteration took place and clay, silt and sulfur bearing rocks are also found.

Climate and ecology 

There are few data on climate at Socompa. The area is windy and dry given that the volcano lies in the Desert Puna, with frequent snow cover  and penitentes but no glaciers. The relatively low cloud cover means that insolation is high. Periglacial landforms indicate that in the past the area was wetter, possibly thanks to the Little Ice Age. There is, however, no evidence for Pleistocene glaciation including no cirques, which may be due to the volcano's young age.

The autotrophic communities on Socompa are the highest known in the world, and they occur both on the actual fumaroles and on "cold fumaroles". The various species are often extremophiles since the environment on Socompa is harsh, and the communities also include heterotrophic species. Such heterotrophs include ascomycota and basidiomycota, the latter of which have noticeable similarity to Antarctic basidiomycota.

The fumaroles on Socompa also feature stands of bryophytes such as liverworts and mosses as well as lichens and algae, and animals have been found in the stands. These stands are among the highest in the world and cover noticeably large surface areas despite their elevation, and are fairly remote from other plant life in the region. There is a noticeable diversity between separate stands, and the vegetation is quite dissimilar to the vegetation in the surroundings but resembles that found in the paramo and cloud forests in South America and the subantarctic islands. A sparse vegetation cover is also found on the lower slopes of Socompa. The black-headed lizard and its relative Liolaemus porosus live on its slopes, and mice have been observed in the summit area.

Eruptive history 
Activity at Socompa commenced with the extrusion of andesites, which were followed later by dacites. Several Plinian eruptions have occurred on Socompa. Several dates have been obtained on Socompa rocks, including 2,000,000 ± 1,000,000, 1,300,000 ± 500,000, 800,000 ± 300,000 and less than 500,000 years ago. An age of 3,340,000 ± 600,000 years may be of an older volcano, now buried beneath the Socompa edifice. Lava domes and lava flows on the southern side of the volcano have yielded ages of 69,200 ± 6,000, 31,400 ± 3,200, 29,800 ± 3,300 and 22,100 ± 1,900 years ago. After the sector collapse 7,200 years ago, activity continued filling the collapse scar. The explosion craters on the summit are the youngest volcanic landforms on Socompa, one dome in the scar has been dated to 5,910 ± 430 years ago. An eruption 7,220 ± 100 years before present produced the El Túnel pyroclastic deposit on the western side of Socompa. The youngest eruption was dated to have occurred 5,250 years before present.

The absence of moraines on Socompa suggests that volcanic activity occurred during the post-glacial time. The volcano also has a young appearance, similar to historically active Andean volcanoes such as San Pedro, implying recent volcanic activity.

There is no evidence for historical activity at Socompa and the volcano is not considered an active volcano, but both fumarolic activity and the emission of  have been observed. The fumarolic activity occurs at at least six sites and is relatively weak; anecdotal reports indicate a smell of sulfur on the summit. Socompa is considered to be Argentina's 13th most dangerous volcano out of 38. Apart from the Socompa railway station and mining camps west of the volcano, there is little infrastructure that could be impacted by future eruptions. Large explosive eruptions during summer may result in pyroclastic fallout west of the volcano, while during the other seasons fallout would be concentrated east of it.

Groundwater is warmer and richer in  the closer to Socompa it is pumped, also suggesting that volcanic gas fluxes still occur at the volcano and that the volcano influences groundwater systems. Hot springs are found at Laguna Socompa as well. In 2011, the Chilean mining company Escondida Mining was considering building a geothermal power plant on Socompa to supply energy; the Argentine Servicio Geológico Minero agency started exploration work in January 2018 for geothermal power production.

See also
 List of volcanoes in Argentina
 List of volcanoes in Chile
 List of Ultras of South America

Notes

References

References

External links

 
 "Volcán Socompa, Argentina/Chile" on Peakbagger

Six-thousanders of the Andes
Volcanoes of Antofagasta Region
Volcanoes of Salta Province
Stratovolcanoes of Chile
Subduction volcanoes
Mountains of Argentina
Stratovolcanoes of Argentina
Polygenetic volcanoes
Argentina–Chile border
International mountains of South America
Puna de Atacama
Mountains of Antofagasta Region
Mountains of Salta Province
Pleistocene stratovolcanoes
Holocene stratovolcanoes